Vice President of the Republic of the Congo was a political position in Congo Brazzaville from 1960 to 1979.

Vice Presidents were appointed by the president.

Republic of the Congo

People's Republic of the Congo

References

Politics of the Republic of the Congo
Government of the Republic of the Congo
Congo
Vice presidents of the Republic of the Congo